IGF-II may refer to:

 Insulin-like growth factor 2
 Insulin-like growth factor II IRES